Ismail "Izzy" Smith-Wade-El is an American politician serving as a member of the Pennsylvania House of Representatives for the 49th district. Elected in November 2022, he assumed office on December 1, 2022.

Early life and education 
Smith-Wade-El was born and raised in Lancaster, Pennsylvania. He earned a Bachelor of Arts degree in theatre and anthropology from Carnegie Mellon University in 2014.

Career 
Smith-Wade-El served as a member of the Lancaster City Council from 2017 until his resignation in 2022 following his election to the Pennsylvania House of Representatives. He also worked as a program specialist at the Lancaster County Homeless Coalition. Smith-Wade-El was elected to the Pennsylvania House of Representatives in November 2022.

References 

Living people
Year of birth missing (living people)
Members of the Pennsylvania House of Representatives
Pennsylvania city council members
People from Lancaster, Pennsylvania
Politicians from Lancaster, Pennsylvania
Carnegie Mellon University alumni
Pennsylvania Democrats